The Taiwan Cultural Center is a cultural center in Toranomon, Minato, Tokyo, Japan about Taiwan, located at Toranomon Hills building.

History

The cultural center was originally opened as Taipei Cultural Center on 21 April 2010 at Taipei Economic and Cultural Representative Office in Japan. On 12 June 2015, the relocation and opening ceremony was held to welcome the center in its new location at Toranomon Hills building as Taiwan Cultural Center. Speaking during the ceremony, Culture Minister Hung Meng-chi hoped that the new center will attract more Japanese to know Taiwan.

Transportation
The center is accessible within walking distance south of Toranomon Station of Tokyo Metro.

See also
 Japan–Taiwan relations
 Taiwan under Japanese rule

References

2010 establishments in Japan
Cultural centers in Japan
Japan–Taiwan relations
Buildings and structures in Minato, Tokyo
Buildings and structures completed in 2010